Chik Bazar is a bazaar located in Rawalpindi, Pakistan. 

The bazaar is known for cane and bamboo sticks, blinds, and other handicrafts. Apart from Pakistan, people from other countries also contact the artisans of this market to make handicrafts.

References

Further reading
Khan, Ali (2015). Rawul Pindee: The Raj Years 

Shopping districts and streets in Pakistan
Tourist attractions in Rawalpindi
Populated places in Rawalpindi City
Rawalpindi City
Bazaars in Rawalpindi